Gobbel or Göbbel may refer to:

Gunther Göbbel, German singer and music producer, also part of Meant 2 Be and Lemon Ice
Sylvia Gobbel, German artist and model
Ulrich van Gobbel (born 1971), Dutch football player and coach

See also
Goebel (disambiguation)
Goebbels (disambiguation)
Gobbeldygook or gobbel dy gook, Gibberish, also called jibber-jabber, a speech that is (or appears to be) nonsense